Jim Provenzano (born December 6, 1961) is an American author, playwright, photographer and currently an editor with the Bay Area Reporter.

Life and work

Born in Queens, New York, Provenzano was raised in Ashland, Ohio and attended Kent State University from 1979–80 as a theater major, a summer internship at Porthouse Theatre in Akron, where he performed the title role in a 1980 production of The Who's musical Tommy.

After transferring to Ohio State University in 1981, he graduated with a bachelor of fine arts in dance in 1985. While a student, he created stage works and video adaptations of dances, performed in works by fellow students and guest teachers Mark Taylor, Stephen Koester, Terry Creach. He received summer scholarships from the Dayton Ballet and Bill Evans Dance Company at Allegheny College.

In 1985-1986 he lived in Pittsburgh and worked and toured with the Pittsburgh Dance Alloy. He also directed two Sam Shepard plays, Cowboy Mouth and Action as well as original performance works, in his rented expansive loft with theater seats.

After moving to New York City in 1986, he performed with various modern dance choreographers, including Steve Gross and Bill Cratty, touring with Cratty's company for a year, and at The Yard on Martha's Vineyard in 1987.

Provenzano created his own dance, music and performance works from 1987–92 in New York and performed at Franklin Furnace, P.S. 122, Dance Theatre Workshop, Highways in Santa Monica, and several other venues. In 1988, he directed a New Jersey production of As Is. With a fellowship in Interdisciplinary Arts, he wrote, composed and set-designed the musical, Under the River, set in the World Trade Center's PATH station. It played at the Ohio Theatre in September 1998, produced with Theatre Tweed.

In 1989 he began working as the publisher's assistant for OutWeek magazine and also contributed his first news and arts stories for editors Michelangelo Signorile, Sarah Pettit, and Gabriel Rotello. In 1990, he became the editor of the publication's offshoot Hunt, an entertainment weekly, before both publications folded in July 1991.

Many of his former coworkers, including Dale Peck, Troy Masters and Walter Armstrong went on to continue publishing journalism and novels. During that time, he was also a member of both ACT UP and Queer Nation, participating in protests for both organizations. He also wrote freelance arts features for Frontiers, The Advocate, High Performance and San Francisco Sentinel, including interviews with Clive Barker, Chita Rivera, and Paul Bartel.

Provenzano moved to San Francisco after visiting in 1992, when he was offered a position as an assistant editor for the Bay Area Reporter. He completed a language certificate at Florence's Scuola Leonardo da Vinci in 1995. In 1997, Provenzano completed a master of arts degree in English/creative writing at San Francisco State University.

In 1996 then-Bay Area Reporter editor Mike Salinas asked him to write a sports column to cover the LGBT athletics community. Among the publication's first sports writers was Gay Games cofounder Tom Waddell.

Sports Complex was published weekly until 2006. The column was internationally syndicated from 2004–06. Among the topics covered were the controversies of the California AIDSRide, financial controversies and accomplishments of the Gay Games and Outgames, as well as interviews with, and articles about gay and lesbian athletes, including Esera Tuaolo, Jerry Smith, Glenn Burke, David Kopay, Billie Jean King, Greg Louganis, and several gay and lesbian Olympic athletes. Provenzano has frequently been interviewed in print, television, radio and films for his expertise on the LGBT athletics movement.

Provenzano is also the author of seven novels, most notably PINS (1999) about gay high school wrestlers. The book was included in more than a dozen college reading lists, and remained among the top ten bestselling gay fiction titles in 2000. Provenzano often trained, competed and medaled with the Golden Gate Wrestling Club from 1992 to 2006. He also competed and medaled in track and field events with the San Francisco Track & Field Club from 2003-2006.

After being commissioned to adapt PINS to the stage, the work premiered at New Conservatory Theatre Center, running from August through September 2002. A Chicago staging took place in 2006.

In 2003, Provenzano published Monkey Suits, about gay cater-waiters in 1980s Manhattan, and Cyclizen (2007) about a gay bicycle messenger in 1990s New York City, which both fictionalize his experiences in AIDS activism. Nearly two dozen anthologies published from 1998 to 2007 include his short stories and essays.

In 2005, Provenzano was asked to guest-curate the world's first gay sports exhibit, Sporting Life: GLBT Athletics and Cultural Change from the 1960s to Today for the GLBT Historical Society in San Francisco. The exhibit displayed hundreds of items from more than 40 teams, and was extended through 2006.

Provenzano returned as an Editor with the Bay Area Reporter in September 2006. In May, 2010, he co-created and became editor of BARtab, the Reporters (initially monthly, now weekly) LGBT nightlife guide. In March 2020, he was promoted to Arts & Entertainment Editor at the Bay Area Reporter.

In December 2011, he published his fourth novel, Every Time I Think of You, about two gay teenage athletes in the 1970s, one of whom becomes paraplegic. The novel won a Lambda Literary Award in 2012.

March 20, 2014, he published Message of Love, the sequel to Every Time I Think of You, where in Philadelphia, the lead characters Reid and Everett go through their early 1980s college years at both Temple University and University of Pennsylvania as the AIDS epidemic approaches. The novel was selected as a Lambda Literary Award finalist in 2015.

In May, 2016, he published Forty Wild Crushes; stories.

In 2018, he contracted with Beautiful Dreamer Press to publish his sixth novel, Now I'm Here, with a September 2018 publication. Set mostly in rural Ohio in the 1970s and 1980s, it focuses on the lives of Joshua, a gay piano prodigy who gains fame for his piano solo version of Queen's "Bohemian Rhapsody," and his relationship with David, the son of a pumpkin farmer.

In June 2020, he published audiobook adaptations of his novels Every Time I Think of You and Message of Love with narrator Michael Wetherbee.

In September 2020, his seventh novel, Finding Tulsa, was released with Palm Drive Publishing. The expansive novel is the faux-memoir of gay film director Stan Grozniak, who reconnects with Lance, his teenage crush from a 1970s summer theatre production of the musical Gypsy.

Through 2021, as part of the Bay Area Reporters 50th anniversary celebrations, he produced and hosted twelve monthly panels about the history of the newspaper, with dozens of current and former writers, editors, photographers and special guests. The panels are archived on the B.A.R.'s YouTube channel.

In May 2022, he edited and self-published The Lost of New York, a novel written more than 50 years ago by his late uncle, John "Butch" Rigney, Jr. 

Provenzano is openly gay.  He currently lives in San Francisco.

Works

Fiction
 PINS (1999)
 Wrestling Team (German translation of PINS, 2003)
 Monkey Suits (2003)
 Cyclizen (2007)
 Every Time I Think of You (2011)
 PINS; audiobook adaptation (2013)
 Message of Love (2014)
 Forty Wild Crushes: stories (2016)
 Now I'm Here (2018)
 Every Time I Think of You; audiobook adaptation (2020)
 Message of Love; audiobook adaptation (2020)
 Finding Tulsa (2020)
 The Lost of New York by John Rigney, Jr. (Editor/Publisher) (2022)

Plays
 PINS (2002, adapted from his novel)
 Bootless Cries (1998)
 Under the River (1988)

Honors
 San Francisco Press Club Awards, second place, entertainment feature (2022)
 Lambda Literary Award finalist (Gay Romance) 2015, for the novel Message of Love
 Lambda Literary Award (Gay Romance) 2012, for the novel Every Time I Think of You
 Legacy Award in Journalism, Federation of Gay Games (2006)
 100 Champions Award, Gay Games Chicago], (2006)
 Bay Area Theatre Critics Award, PINS (2002)
 Fellowship, Interdisciplinary Arts, New Jersey Arts Council (1988)

Further reading
 "Jim Provenzano: Muscle Memory", Lambda Literary Review July 24, 2012
 "Sports, Sex and Paraplegia", Dan Woog, The Outfield, February 2012
 Author Interview, Windy City Times May 16, 2012
 Lambda Literary Review essay on Romance novels, Lambda Literary Review March 2012
 "Audible Art: How to Make an Audio Book", Earl August 9, 2013
 Video Feature, Gay People's Chronicle October 26, 2012
 "Exhibit Shows How Gays Have Shaped Sports", San Francisco Chronicle April 2, 2005
 Gay Games VI Sydney photojournalism, 'Sports Complex column, Bay Area Reporter August–December 2002
 Wrestling with Sexuality, The Advocate, Dec. 21, 1999
 Now I'm Here interview in Los Angeles Blade October 3, 2018 
 Now I'm Here interview in San Francisco Examiner September 17, 2018 
 Now I'm Here in SF Review of Books December 22, 2019
 Now I'm Here review in Out in Print July 9, 2018
 Now I'm Here in Passport Best Books August 2018
 Finding Tulsa review in Art & Understanding January 8, 2021
 Finding Tulsa review in Edge Media September 29, 2020
 Finding Tulsa review in Echo Magazine January 1, 2021

References

 Amazon.com listing
 summary of reviews of the PINS stage adaptation produced in Chicago, June 2006, various publications]
 
 Internet Book Database listing

External links
 www.jimprovenzano.com, Official Site
 Author Blog
 Facebook Author Page
 Cyclizen blog; archive
 SportsComplex.org; archive
 Sporting Life exhibit archive

1961 births
Living people
American gay writers
People from San Francisco
American LGBT journalists
Lambda Literary Award winners
Journalists from California
Journalists from New York City